Joan Brady (born 1950) is an American best-selling writer since 1995.

Biography
Joan Brady grew up on New Jersey, one of seven children; she had four brothers and two sisters.  In 1972 she graduated with a Bachelor of Science degree in Nursing from William Paterson University. She worked during twenty-two years as a registered nurse, before published her best-selling debut novel, God on a Harley.

She lives in San Diego, California.

Bibliography

God on a Harley Serie
God on a Harley (1995)
Joyride (2003)

Single novels
Heaven in High Gear (1997)
Angel on a Harley

Non fiction
I Don't Need a Baby to Be Who I Am: Thoughts And Affirmations On a Fulfilling Life (1998)

References and sources

1950 births
Living people
20th-century American novelists
21st-century American novelists
Novelists from New Jersey
William Paterson University alumni
Christian novelists
American women novelists
20th-century American women writers
21st-century American women writers